This is a comprehensive list of awards and nominations received by South Korean rapper, record producer and singer-songwriter Zico. A member of boy band Block B, he has individually been the recipient of numerous awards.



Awards and nominations

Other accolades

State and cultural honors

Listicles

Notes

References

Zico